Teluk Kalung is mukim in Kemaman District, Terengganu, Malaysia. The Perwaja Steel mill is located here, as is a plant of the Huntsman (Chemical) Corporation which produced titanium dioxide.

References

 Ibu Menteri Besar Meninggal Dunia
 MB Lawat ITC

Kemaman District
Mukims of Terengganu